Wyatt Omsberg (born September 21, 1995) is an American professional soccer player who plays as a defender for Major League Soccer club Chicago Fire.

Career

Youth and college
Omsberg grew up in Scarborough, Maine and played soccer at Scarborough High School, where he helped lead the Red Storm to a Class "A" State Championship in 2012 & 2013. In 2014, he was named the Maine Gatorade Player of the Year for scoring 19 goals and 12 assists as a senior.

Omsberg attended Dartmouth College, where he played college soccer as a centre-back for the Big Green from 2014–2017, tallying a total of 10 goals and 3 assists in 73 appearances. During his time at Dartmouth, Omsberg was a four-time Ivy League Champion, a two-time Ivy League Defensive Player of the Year, and a three-time First Team All-Ivy honoree. In addition, he won Dartmouth's biggest BB award his senior year.

While in college, he played in the PDL with GPS Portland Phoenix and the Seacoast United Phantoms.

Minnesota United
On January 19, 2018, Omsberg was drafted in the first round (15th overall) of the 2018 MLS SuperDraft, by Minnesota United FC. He became the first Ivy League player ever to be drafted in the first round of the MLS SuperDraft.
He signed with the club on February 28, 2018.

Omsberg made his professional debut on March 24, 2018, starting in a 3–0 loss to the New York Red Bulls.

On April 26, 2018, Omsberg joined USL side Tulsa Roughnecks on loan. He made his league debut for the club on April 28, 2018, in a 1–1 away draw with Sacramento Republic.

In April 2019, Omsberg was loaned out to Minnesota's USL League One affiliate Forward Madison ahead of their inaugural season. He made his league debut for the club on April 6, 2019, in a 1–0 away defeat to Chattanooga Red Wolves.

Chicago Fire
On February 11, 2020, Omsberg was traded by Minnesota United to the Chicago Fire in exchange for Raheem Edwards.

Career statistics

Honors
Individual
 Ivy League Defensive Player of the Year: 2016, 2017 
 NSCAA All-East Region First Team: 2015, 2016, 2017
 NSCAA Second Team All-American: 2017
 First Team All-Ivy: 2015, 2016, 2017
 Academic All-Ivy: 2017
 NSCAA Third Team All-American: 2016
 Ivy League Honorable Mention: 2014

References

External links 
 Major League Soccer Profile.

1995 births
Living people
People from Belgrade, Maine
Soccer players from Maine
American soccer players
Association football defenders
Chicago Fire FC players
Dartmouth Big Green men's soccer players
FC Tulsa players
Forward Madison FC players
GPS Portland Phoenix players
Major League Soccer players
Minnesota United FC draft picks
Minnesota United FC players
Seacoast United Phantoms players
USL Championship players
USL League One players
USL League Two players